Seaman Block Jacobs (February 25, 1912 – April 8, 2008) was an American screenwriter. He wrote episodes for several TV shows, such as The Addams Family, The Lucy Show, I Dream of Jeannie, F-Troop, The Andy Griffith Show, Here's Lucy and Diff'rent Strokes. He was nominated for an Emmy Award in 1978 for Outstanding Writing in a Comedy-Variety or Music Special for The George Burns One-Man Show in 1977.

He co-wrote for I Love Lucy and The Love Boat with Freddie Fox (screenwriter).

On April 8, 2008, Jacobs died of cardiac arrest at the age of 96.

Selected filmography

References

External links 

 Comedy Writer Seaman Jacobs passes away at 96
 

American male screenwriters
American television writers
People from Kingston, New York
1912 births
2008 deaths
American male television writers
Screenwriters from New York (state)
20th-century American male writers
20th-century American screenwriters